Henriette Henriot (born Marie Henriette Alphonsine Grossin; 14 November 1857 – 17 March 1944) was an actress and a favourite model of the French artist Renoir. She is known for the model in his painting La Parisienne on display at the National Museum, Cardiff.

Henriot, the daughter of Aline Grossin, a milliner, started at the Conservatoire de musique et de déclamation in Paris in 1872, where she studied acting. She was still using her birth name of Marie Henriette Alphonsine Grossin, and it wasn't until 1874 when she started to use her stage names of Henriette Henriot, Mademoiselle Henriot, and Madame Henriot when she was appearing in acting roles at the Théâtre de l'Ambigu-Comique and had started modelling for Renoir as a way to earn extra cash. It was at this point that she was performing in minor parts in the Théâtre de l'Odéon, Théâtre Libre and Théâtre de l'Ambigu-Comique.

Colin Bailey formerly of the Frick Collection said in an exhibition catalogue in 2012: Renoir, Impressionism, and Full-Length Painting:

Between 1874 and 1876 Henriot modelled for five of Renoir's most ambitious full-length pictures and at least seven smaller works. She appears fully and fashionably dressed in La Parisienne, draped and damp in La Source; seated in the shade with a suitor in the Lovers; in Troubadour costume in The Page, and as the protective elder sister in La Promenade.

It is not known whether Renoir ever paid Henriot for modelling, however he did give her two paintings, the last painting he did of her was A Vase of Flowers. Renoir had also become close friends with her during this time, so much so that he also painted her daughter, Jeanne Angèle Grossin (1878 – 1900) who modelled for him in Fillette au chapeau bleu (Little girl in blue hat). Jeanne was killed in a theater fire in 1900, when she was 21.

Stage career

The following is a selection of plays that Henriot acted in:

1875	Le Fils du Diable by Paul Féval 
1975	La Vénus by Gordes d’Adolphe Belot
1975	Le Fils de Chopart by Jules Dornay
1877	Pépite
1882	Une aventure de Garrick by Fabrice Labrousse
1883	La Famille d'Armelles by Jean Marras
1883	Sganarelle by Molière
1894	La Belle Limonadière by Paul Mahalin
1895	L'Argent by Émile Fabre directed by André Antoine
1898	Mon enfant by Ambroise Janvier
1902	Nini l'assommeur by Maurice Bernhardt
1904	Le Bercail by Henri Bernstein
1905	La Rafale (Whirlwind) by Henri Bernstein
1908	Le Petit Fouchard by Charles Raymond
1908	Le Passe-partout by Georges Thurner
1909	Pierre et Thérèse by Marcel Prévost
1912	La Crise by Paul Bourget 
1912	Le Mystère de la chambre jaune by Gaston Leroux
1914	Monsieur Brotonneau by Robert de Flers

Modelling career

See also
 Impressionism
 Theatre of France

References

External links
 

1857 births
1944 deaths
Actresses from Paris
French female models
Conservatoire de Paris alumni
Burials at Passy Cemetery